The Kwun Tong District Council is the district council for the Kwun Tong District in Hong Kong. It is one of 18 such councils. The Kwun Tong District Council consists of 40 members since January 2020, of which the district is divided into 40 constituencies, electing a total of 40 members. The council was created in April 1981 under the District Board Ordinance 1981. The last election was held on 24 November 2019.

History
The Kwun Tong District Council was established on 2 April 1981 under the name of the Kwun Tong District Board as the result of the colonial Governor Murray MacLehose's District Administration Scheme reform. The District Board was partly elected with the ex-officio Urban Council members, as well as members appointed by the Governor until 1994 when last Governor Chris Patten refrained from appointing any member.

The Kwun Tong District Board became Kwun Tong Provisional District Board after the Hong Kong Special Administrative Region (HKSAR) was established in 1997 with the appointment system being reintroduced by Chief Executive Tung Chee-hwa. The Kwun Tong District Council was established on 1 January 2000 after the first post-handover District Council election in 1999. The council has become fully elected when the appointed seats were abolished in 2011 after the modified constitutional reform proposal was passed by the Legislative Council in 2010.

The Kwun Tong District Council is one of the largest District Councils in Hong Kong. Due to its large population, the political parties' influence was countered by the conservative independent community leaders. Because of the large presence of lower-income groups and industrial character, the Kwun Tong District Council has also been a stronghold for the pro-Beijing grassroots political groups, including the Kwun Tong Residents Association headed by Hau Shui-pui, council chairman from 1997 to 2003, and Democratic Alliance for the Betterment and Progress of Hong Kong (DAB) and its Legislative Councillor Chan Kam-lam. It also the voter base of pro-democracy politicians Szeto Wah of the Hong Kong Professional Teachers' Union (PTU), and Fred Li of the Meeting Point who was first elected to the District Board in the 1985 election and got directly elected to the Legislative Council with Szeto through the district in 1991.

The pro-democracy camp first achieved more than half of the elected seats and took control of the board in the 1994 election. The pro-democracy majority was offset by the appointed members after 1997. In the tide of democracy caused by the 2003 July 1 march, the pro-democrats again achieved majority of the elected seats but was countered by the appointed seats. The pro-democracy influence shrank significantly after 2003, with the Democratic Party dropped their seats from nine seats in the 2003 election to three in their territory-wide defeat in 2007 and had not yet been able to recover from it until the 2019 landslide victory which gave the pro-democrats the control of the council with 28 of the 40 seats and Democratic Party rebounding to the largest party status.

Political control
Since 1982 political control of the council has been held by the following parties:

Political makeup

Elections are held every four years.

District result maps

Members represented
Starting from 1 January 2020:

Leadership

Chairs
Since 1985, the chairman is elected by all the members of the board:

Vice Chairs

Notes

References

District Councils of Hong Kong